Tizi n'Tichka is a mountain pass in Morocco, linking the south-east of Marrakesh to the city of Ouarzazat through the High Atlas mountains. It lies above the great Marrakesh plains, and is a gateway to the Sahara Desert.

Climate and elevation
From November through March, snow can often fall on the pass, but it can be warm all year round in the strong sun. It is the highest major mountain pass in North Africa. The road was constructed along the old caravan trail by the French military in 1936, and is now part of National Route 9 (formerly Route P-31).

Fauna
The last known wild Barbary lion in Morocco was shot near Tizi-n-Tichka in 1942.

Gallery

See also
 Maghreb
 Wildlife of Morocco

References

External links
 
 Tizi n'Tichka on Frommer's

Mountain passes of Morocco